Gary Dennis Danielson (born September 10, 1951) is an American college football commentator and former professional American football player. Danielson was a quarterback in the National Football League (NFL). He played for the Detroit Lions from 1976 to 1984 and for the Cleveland Browns in 1985, 1987, and 1988. Since 2006, he has worked for CBS Sports as a commentator for its Southeastern Conference college football coverage and previously held the same position for ABC Sports from 1997 through 2005 and ESPN from 1990 through 1996.

Playing career
Danielson played high school football at Divine Child High School under Tony Versaci in Dearborn, Michigan, and graduated from the school in 1969. As the left side wide receiver in his junior year and quarterback in his senior year, he helped Divine Child win two straight Catholic High School League championships. He played college football at Purdue University and graduated in 1973 with a Bachelor of Arts in industrial management. He would later earn a Master's degree in physical education in 1976. Danielson had succeeded Mike Phipps as the Boilermakers' starting quarterback in 1970 and had 14 touchdown passes and 30 interceptions with a 45.6 percent completion rate in three seasons as a starter.

Danielson spent two years in the short-lived World Football League as a non-starter, with the New York Stars/Charlotte Hornets in 1974 and the Chicago Winds in 1975. The Winds franchise folded a month before the league's collapse in October, and Danielson signed with the Lions for the 1976 season.

He amassed 13,764 passing yards and 81 touchdowns in 101 games in the NFL. He ranks fourth in Lions history in passing yards and touchdowns. His five touchdowns in a 1978 game against the Minnesota Vikings is still tied for a Lions record.

Broadcasting career
Danielson got a start on his broadcasting career before his playing days were over. He was a part-time anchor/reporter at WDIV-TV during the off-season while a member of the Lions. In Cleveland, he co-hosted a sports talk show while a member of the Browns.

After retiring from the Browns, Danielson joined ESPN as a college football analyst. He continued to work in that capacity for ESPN/ABC Sports until 2006 when he joined CBS Sports as a college football analyst, partnered with Verne Lundquist (and currently Brad Nessler) on the network's primary broadcast team during Southeastern Conference telecasts. He also serves as the college football radio analyst for Paul Finebaum where he appears weekly during the college football season. Starting in the 2011 college football season, Danielson became a weekly guest on Mike's On: Francesa on the FAN with Mike Francesa. He has also become a regular guest on The Dan Patrick Show.

Personal life
Danielson is married to wife Kristy with whom he has four children. The two met in college at Purdue, where Kristy's father, George King, was the head basketball coach and athletic director.

The Danielson family resided in Rochester Hills, Michigan and the children attended Rochester Adams High School. His son, Matt, played college football at Northwestern.

Danielson ran an importing and exporting business with former Lions teammate James Jones in the early 1990s. He has also invested in business ventures with former Browns teammate Bernie Kosar.

References

External links
 

1951 births
Living people
Alliance of American Football announcers
American football quarterbacks
ArenaBowl broadcasters
Arena football announcers
Cleveland Browns players
College football announcers
Detroit Lions players
National Football League announcers
National Football League replacement players
New York Stars players
Players of American football from Detroit
Purdue Boilermakers football players
Sportspeople from Dearborn, Michigan